Gerd vom Bruch (born 19 August 1941) is a German former football player and coach. He later worked as a player agent.

References

1941 births
Living people
German footballers
Sportfreunde Siegen players
German football managers
Borussia Mönchengladbach managers
Bundesliga managers
Association football midfielders